Dracula cochliops is a species of orchid found in Colombia.

References 

cochliops